William Cornman Spicer (born March 27, 1868) was an American college football player and coach. He served as the head coach at Hamilton College in 1894.

Spicer was unofficially considered the first coach of the University of Virginia football team in 1892.

Head coaching record

References

1868 births
Year of death missing
19th-century players of American football
American football halfbacks
Hamilton Continentals football coaches
Princeton Tigers football players
Virginia Cavaliers football coaches
Players of American football from Harrisburg, Pennsylvania
Sportspeople from Harrisburg, Pennsylvania